Mater Dei High School may refer to:

 Mater Dei High School (Santa Ana, California), Catholic high school in Orange County, California
 Mater Dei High School (Breese, Illinois), Catholic high school in Clinton County, Illinois
 Mater Dei High School (Evansville, Indiana), Catholic high school in Vanderburgh County, Indiana
 Mater Dei High School (New Jersey), Catholic high school in Middletown Township, New Jersey
 Mater Dei Catholic High School (Chula Vista, California)
 Mater Dei Catholic College, Catholic high school in Wagga Wagga, New South Wales, Australia